Awaken is the first full-length Japanese album (second overall) by South Korean boy band NCT 127, the second multi-national sub-unit of NCT. Released by their Japanese label Avex Trax on April 17, 2019, the album was the second major release for the Japanese market from the group and their first to not feature Winwin, who was on a hiatus due to his participation in WayV's promotion. SM Entertainment's founder Lee Soo-man served as the album's executive producer, with lyrical and musical composition contributed by Andreas Öberg, Sebastian Thott, David Amber, Jung Youth, Tony Esterly, Jonny Shorr, LDN Noise, Deez, Adrian Mckinnon, Mike Daley, Yoo Young-jin, Harvey Mason Jr., Dem Jointz, MEG.ME and others. A hip-hop and R&B-heavily dominant record, Awaken contains songs corporating elements from pop and electronic music, performing in Japanese, Korean and English in order to "continue" the story from their first Japanese extended play Chain (2018).

Upon its release, the album debuted at number four on the Oricon Weekly Albums chart with 53,042 copies sold in its first week of its release, as well as at number 14 on the Oricon Weekly Digital Albums chart with 978 downloads, becoming the group's third top five entry on the former chart. To promote the album, NCT 127 embarked on their first Japan concert tour, titled Neo City – The Origin. The album also spawned two singles prior to its release, namely the Japanese version of "Touch" on September 16, 2018 and "Wakey-Wakey" on March 19, 2019.

Background and release
After making their debut in the Japanese market with the extended play, Chain, in 2018, NCT 127 released their first Japanese studio album, Awaken, on April 17, 2019.

It was released in fourteen versions: a limited CD+DVD edition that reverts to a regular edition once depleted, a limited CD+Blu-ray edition that reverts to a regular edition once depleted, and nine limited CD member editions that revert to a regular CD edition once depleted. All limited editions came with one trading card of nine types.

The music video teaser for the lead single, "Wakey-Wakey", was released on March 17, 2019, and the full music video was released on March 18, 2019.

Promotion
It was announced in August 2018 that NCT 127 would embark on their first nationwide Japan tour, Neo City – The Origin, starting in Osaka on February 2, 2019, with a total of seven stops in Hiroshima, Kanazawa, Sapporo, Fukuoka, Nagoya, Saitama and Osaka.

Track listing

Charts

Release history

References

External links
 

NCT 127 albums
Dance-pop albums by South Korean artists
Hip hop albums by South Korean artists
SM Entertainment albums
Japanese-language albums
Avex Group albums
IRiver albums